The women's 4 × 400 metres relay at the 2016 IAAF World Indoor Championships took place on March 20, 2016.

The favorites and home team, USA, pulled no punches, strategically placing their fastest starter, Natasha Hastings on the lead leg.  As planned, she took the lead at the break, holding off a feisty Romanian, Adelina Pastor around the third turn.  Long striding Jamaican lead runner Patricia Hall found herself walled off.  Down the backstretch she tangled legs, possibly with Poland's Ewelina Ptak and Nigeria's Margaret Bamgbose behind her.  Suddenly Hall was down on her face, hard.  The race was running away from her.  With their closest competitors out of the race, the USA had no one near them and no traffic.  They extended their lead with each leg, setting a new national record with an easy victory.  Behind them was a close battle for the other medals, Romania holding the early lead with Nigeria's Regina George and Poland's Małgorzata Hołub edging ahead of Elena Mirela Lavric at the end of the second leg.  Magdalena Gorzkowska took the lead for Poland at the second handoff and they never relinquished it.  On the final lap Bianca Răzor ran down Ada Benjamin to take the bronze for Romania.  The Polish and Romanian teams were elated with their unexpected medals.

Results
The race was started at 14:20.

References

4 x 400 metres relay
4 × 400 metres relay at the World Athletics Indoor Championships
2016 in women's athletics